Aiza Kutysheva (born 1977) is a Kazakhstani weightlifter, and official.

She competed at the 1999 World Weightlifting Championships, 2001 World Weightlifting Championships, and 2002 World Weightlifting Championships.

She was a Technical Controller at the 2011 Youth and Junior Asian Weightlifting Championships.

References 

1977 births
Kazakhstani female weightlifters
Living people
20th-century Kazakhstani women
21st-century Kazakhstani women